Ayon is a surname. Notable people with the surname include:

Ana Duran Ayon (born 1997), Mexican weightlifter
Belkis Ayón (1967–1999), Cuban printmaker
Gustavo Ayón (born 1985), Mexican basketball player

See also
Ayton (surname)
Ryon